Give Me Your Love is the debut and only released album of singer Sylvia Striplin.

Reception

Released on Roy Ayers's Uno Melodic record label in 1981. While it didn't make a dent on the R&B charts, over time it has eventually become a rare groove favorite. Led by the often sampled classic song "You Can't Turn Me Away" which was sampled by The Notorious B.I.G. mentored group, Junior M.A.F.I.A. on their song "Get Money" in 1995.

Track listing 
"Look Towards The Sky" - (Sylvia Striplin)  4:34
"Toy Box" - (Jaymz Bedford)  4:16
"You Can't Turn Me Away" - (Roy Ayers, Sylvia Striplin, Jaymz Bedford)  	5:31
"All Alone" - (Luther Wilson, Tanya Woods)  5:12
"Give Me Your Love" - (Jaymz Bedford)  6:20
"Will We Ever Pass This Way Again" - (Luther Wilson, Tanya Woods)  	4:37
"Searchin - (Roy Ayers)  6:29
"You Said" - (Sylvia Striplin, Roy Ayers)  4:54

Personnel
Sylvia Striplin - lead and backing vocals, handclaps
Nathan Lamar Watts, Peter Brown, William Allen - bass
Rick Zunigar, Jef Lee Johnson, Chuck Anthony, Randy Russell Pigeé - guitar
Steve Cobb, Dennis Davis, Omar-Ibn-Hakim - drums
Philip Woo - Oberheim synthesizer
Mudbone - electric piano 
Justo Almario - soprano saxophone 
James "Jaymz" Bedford - Clavinet
William Allen - string arrangements

External links
 Sylvia Striplin-Give Me Your Love at Discogs

References

1981 debut albums
albums produced by Roy Ayers
Soul albums by American artists
Funk albums by American artists